Klaudiusz Łatkowski (born March 12, 1985 in Ostrowiec Świętokrzyski) is a retired Polish professional football player.

External links
 

1985 births
Living people
Polish footballers
Radomiak Radom players
KSZO Ostrowiec Świętokrzyski players
People from Ostrowiec Świętokrzyski
Sportspeople from Świętokrzyskie Voivodeship
Association football defenders